{{DISPLAYTITLE:C12H12N2O3}}
The molecular formula C12H12N2O3 (molar mass: 232.23 g/mol, exact mass: 232.0848 u) may refer to:

 Dazoxiben, an antithrombotic agent
 Nalidixic acid, the first of the synthetic quinolone antibiotics
 Phenobarbital, a barbiturate